Zhivko Boyadzhiev  (born 6 November 1976) is a former Bulgarian footballer who played as a midfielder.

External links
  Kaliakra Kavarna profile

1976 births
Living people
Bulgarian footballers
First Professional Football League (Bulgaria) players
PFC Slavia Sofia players
PFC Spartak Varna players
PFC Dobrudzha Dobrich players
PFC Kaliakra Kavarna players
Expatriate footballers in Northern Cyprus

Association football midfielders